The 1957 season was the 86th season in which the English cricket club Derbyshire competed, and their 53rd season in the County Championship. They won eleven matches and lost nine to finish fourth in the Championship.

1957 season

Derbyshire played 28 games in the County Championship, and one match against Cambridge University, and one against the touring West Indians. They won ten matches in the Championship and the match against Cambridge University. Donald Carr was in his third season  as captain. Arnold Hamer was top scorer and Les Jackson took most wickets with 129. 

Newcomers in the season were Ian Gibson, Keith Mohan, and David Short. Gibson played for four seasons, Mohan for two and Short in 1957 and again in 1960.

Matches

{| class="wikitable" width="100%"
! bgcolor="#efefef" colspan=6 | List of  matches
|- bgcolor="#efefef"
!No.
!Date
!V
!Result 
!Margin
!Notes
 |- 
|1
|4 May 1957 
| Yorkshire Park Avenue Cricket Ground, Bradford 
|bgcolor="#FF0000"|Lost 
| 9 wickets
|    Close 108; Trueman 5-66
|- 
|2
|11 May 1957 
| LeicestershireAylestone Road, Leicester 
 |bgcolor="#00FF00"|Won 
| Innings and 132 runs
|    E Smith  6-19 
|- 
|3
|18 May 1957 
| Essex  Ind Coope Ground, Burton-on-Trent 
|bgcolor="#00FF00"|Won 
| Innings and 7 runs
|    C Gladwin  5-24; Bailey 7-61; HL Jackson 7-38  
|- 
|4
|25 May 1957 
| Yorkshire Queen's Park, Chesterfield 
|bgcolor="#00FF00"|Won 
| 84 runs
|    JM Kelly 106; Close 120; HL Jackson 5-51 and 6-63
|- 
|5
|29 May 1957 
|  Sussex    County Ground, Derby  
|bgcolor="#00FF00"|Won 
| 197 runs
|    A Hamer  138
|- 
|6
|1 Jun 1957 
| Lancashire   Aigburth, Liverpool  
|bgcolor="#00FF00"|Won 
| Innings and 66 runs
|    A Hamer  104; HL Jackson 5-63; DC Morgan  6-65 
|- 
|7
|5 Jun 1957 
|Middlesex     Lord's Cricket Ground, St John's Wood 
|bgcolor="#00FF00"|Won 
| 163 runs
|    HL Jackson 6-37; 
|- 
|8
|8 Jun 1957 
| Warwickshire  Edgbaston, Birmingham 
|bgcolor="#FF0000"|Lost 
| 9 wickets
|    Hollies 5-52 and 5-47 
|- 
|9
|12 Jun 1957
| Cambridge University   FP Fenner's Ground, Cambridge 
|bgcolor="#00FF00"|Won 
| 6 wickets
|    E Smith  6-66 
|- 
|10
|15 Jun 1957 
|  WorcestershireCounty Ground, Derby 
|bgcolor="#FFCC00"|Drawn
|
|    Kenyon 175; Richardson 116; Berry 5-71  
|- 
|11
|19 Jun 1957 
| Glamorgan  <small>Queen's Park, Chesterfield </small
|bgcolor="#FFCC00"|Drawn
|
|    Parkhouse 118; JM Kelly 109 
|- 
|12
|22 Jun 1957 
| Somerset Recreation Ground, Bath  
|bgcolor="#00FF00"|Won 
| 9 wickets
|    C Gladwin  5-29 and 8-57; Lobb 5-36 
|- 
|13
|26 Jun 1957 
|  Worcestershire  Tipton Road, Dudley 
|bgcolor="#FF0000"|Lost 
| 2 wickets
|    Richardson 169; A Hamer  134 
|- 
|14
|29 Jun 1957 
|  West Indies  Queen's Park, Chesterfield  
|bgcolor="#FF0000"|Lost 
| 173 runs
|    O Smith 133; Gilchrist 5-41
|- 
|15
|3 Jul 1957 
|  Surrey  County Ground, Derby 
|bgcolor="#FF0000"|Lost 
| 8 wickets
|    Bedser 5-55
|- 
|16
| 6 Jul 1957 
|  Gloucestershire  Wagon Works Ground, Gloucester  
|bgcolor="#00FF00"|Won 
| 2 wickets
|    JM Kelly 113; HL Jackson 7-27; D Smith 5-31 
|- 
|17
|10 Jul 1957
|  Surrey Kennington Oval 
|bgcolor="#FFCC00"|Drawn
|
|    A Hamer  112 
|- 
|18
|13 Jul 1957 
| Nottinghamshire   Trent Bridge, Nottingham 
|bgcolor="#FFCC00"|Drawn
|
|    Goonesena 7-75 
|- 
|19
|17 Jul 1957 
| Middlesex     Queen's Park, Chesterfield 
|bgcolor="#00FF00"|Won 
| Innings and 22 runs
|   C Gladwin  6-23 and 5-18  
|- 
|20
|20 Jul 1957 
| Lancashire   County Ground, Derby  
|bgcolor="#FFCC00"|Drawn
|
|    
|- 
|21
| 27 Jul 1957 
| Nottinghamshire   Rutland Recreation Ground, Ilkeston 
|bgcolor="#FFCC00"|Drawn
|
|    
|- 
|22
| 31 Jul 1957 
| LeicestershireQueen's Park, Chesterfield 
|bgcolor="#00FF00"|Won 
| Innings and 123 runs
|    JM Kelly 127; DB Carr 141; HL Jackson 6-37 
|- 
|23
|3 Aug 1957 
| Warwickshire County Ground, Derby 
|bgcolor="#FFCC00"|Drawn
|
|    Horner 152; M Smith 104; Bannister 7-88 
|- 
|24
|7 Aug 1957 
| Glamorgan  Ynysangharad Park, Pontypridd  
|bgcolor="#FFCC00"|Drawn
|
|    C Gladwin  5-45; McConnon 7-37 
|- 
|25
|10 Aug 1957 
| Hampshire  United Services Recreation Ground, Portsmouth  
|bgcolor="#FFCC00"|Drawn
|
|    Gray 103 
|- 
|26
|14 Aug 1957 
| Kent  County Ground, Derby  
|bgcolor="#FF0000"|Lost 
| Innings and 50 runs
|    Ridgway 6-53 
|- 
|27
|17 Aug 1957 
| Somerset Queen's Park, Chesterfield  
|bgcolor="#FF0000"|Lost 
| Innings and 21 runs
|    Wight 6-29 
|- 
|28
|21 Aug 1957 
| Northamptonshire  County Ground, Northampton  
|bgcolor="#FF0000"|Lost 
| 135 runs
|    DB Carr 5-31; Manning 7-65; E Smith  5-77; Tribe 6-16
|- 
|29
|24 Aug 1957 
| Northamptonshire  Park Road Ground, Buxton 
|bgcolor="#FFCC00"|Drawn
|
|    
|- 
|30
|31 Aug 1957 
|  Sussex    County Ground, Hove 
|bgcolor="#FF0000"|Lost 
| 4 runs
|    Lenham 130; Marlar 6-65 and 5-79; E Smith  5-97
|-

Statistics

County Championship batting averages

County Championship bowling averages

Wicket Keepers
GO Dawkes 	Catches 60, Stumping 4

See also
Derbyshire County Cricket Club seasons
1957 English cricket season

References

1957 in English cricket
Derbyshire County Cricket Club seasons